The 1960–61 season was the Royals 13th season in the NBA and its fourth in Cincinnati. The season was defined by the debut of Oscar Robertson. He would win the Rookie of the Year by nearly averaging a triple double for the entire season. The Big O averaged 30.5 points per game, 10.1 rebounds per game and 9.7 assists per game. He was also MVP of the 1961 NBA All-Star Game.
Robertson's arrival drew considerable publicity to a team on the verge of folding after the last two brutal seasons. Even a year ago, with the Royals playing before sparse crowds, the mantra was ' Robertson will be here next year '.
The Royals actually had four key rookies that year arrive. Along with Robertson, previous #1 pick Bob Boozer, guard Ralph Davis, and college scorer Jay Arnette all arrived to boost the roster.
Tom Marshall had served as coach the previous two difficult years. While many thought a bigger NBA name like Red Rocha should now take over, kindly small-college coach Charlie Wolf was inexpensively brought on to aid the young roster. Wolf moved Robertson to lead guard, and the team immediately improved. Jack Twyman, Wayne Embry and Arlen Bockhorn were solid starters in support of the new superstar. Robertson brought a brash leadership to the team, helping to organize the team's attack. The infusion of talented youth overall gave the team a real lift.
No ordinary rookie, Robertson scored 30.5 points per game, led the NBA in assists by a clear margin, sank the third-highest number of free throws in the league, and was even second on the Royals in rebounding. He was a 6' 5 player unlike any seen before in the NBA.
Robertson's debut was against the now-Los Angeles Lakers in their first game since moving from Minneapolis on October 19. It was also the rookie debut of the Lakers' Jerry West. Robertson triple-doubled in his first NBA game and led the Royals to the highest point total since moving to Cincinnati in the 140–123 win before a large Gardens crowd. Robertson produced large turnouts for the Royals all through November. But the team went 4–13 that month, ending their star's honeymoon. Injuries to the hard-worked Embry saw the team go 6–12 in January, souring the team's playoff chances.
Star forward Twyman was the chief target of Robertson passes. Twyman's deadly jumper found the net at 25.3 points per game.
The Royals would fall 1 game short of a playoff appearance as they finished in last place with a record of 33 wins and 46 losses.

Roster

<noinclude>

Offseason

NBA Draft

Ralph Davis from the University of Cincinnati, a recommended teammate of Robertson, was the team's third pick that year.
The team's previous #1 pick from last year, Bob Boozer from Kansas State, reported this year also. He had spent the previous year with the AAU Peoria Caterpillars. Robertson, Boozer and Arnette had all played on the famed 1960 U.S. Olympic team.

Regular season

Season standings

Record vs. opponents

Game log

Player statistics

Awards and honors
 Oscar Robertson, 1960–61 NBA Rookie Of The Year, First Team All-NBA selection, MVP of the 1961 NBA All-Star Game.
 Jack Twyman, NBA- All-Star, top ten NBA scorer.

References

 Royals on Basketball Reference

Sacramento Kings seasons
Cincinnati
Cincinnati
Cincinnati